In mathematics, a normal map is a concept in geometric topology due to William Browder which is of fundamental importance in surgery theory. Given a Poincaré complex X (more geometrically a Poincaré space), a normal map on X endows the space, roughly speaking, with some of the homotopy-theoretic global structure of a closed manifold. In particular, X has a good candidate for a stable normal bundle and a Thom collapse map, which is equivalent to there being a map from a manifold M to X matching the fundamental classes and preserving normal bundle information. If the dimension of X is  5 there is then only the algebraic topology surgery obstruction due to C. T. C. Wall to X actually being homotopy equivalent to a closed manifold. Normal maps also apply to the study of the uniqueness of manifold structures within a homotopy type, which was pioneered by Sergei Novikov.

The cobordism classes of normal maps on X are called normal invariants. Depending on the category of manifolds (differentiable, piecewise-linear, or topological), there are similarly defined, but inequivalent, concepts of normal maps and normal invariants.

It is possible to perform surgery on normal maps, meaning surgery on the domain manifold, and preserving the map. Surgery on normal maps allows one to systematically kill elements in the relative homotopy groups by representing them as embeddings with trivial normal bundle.

Definition
There are two equivalent definitions of normal maps, depending on whether one uses normal bundles or tangent bundles of manifolds. Hence it is possible to switch between the definitions which turns out to be quite convenient.

1. Given a Poincaré complex X (i.e. a CW-complex whose cellular chain complex satisfies Poincaré duality) of formal dimension , a normal map on X consists of
 a map  from some closed n-dimensional manifold M,
 usually the normal map is supposed to be of degree one. That means that the fundamental class of  should be mapped under  to the fundamental class of : .

2.
 a map  from some closed -dimensional manifold ,
 similarly as above it is required that the fundamental class of  should be mapped under  to the fundamental class of : .

Two normal maps are equivalent if there exists a normal bordism between them.

Role in surgery theory

Surgery on maps versus surgery on normal maps
Consider the question: 
 Is the Poincaré complex X of formal dimension n homotopy-equivalent to a closed n-manifold?
Notice the following: Since our starting map was arbitrarily chosen, and surgery always produces cobordant maps, this procedure has to be performed (in the worst case) for all cobordism classes of maps . This kind of cobordism theory is a homology theory whose coefficients have been calculated by Thom: therefore the cobordism classes of such maps are computable at least in theory for all spaces .

However, it turns out that it is very difficult to decide whether it is possible to make a homotopy equivalence out of the map by means of surgery, whereas the same question is much easier when the map comes with the extra structure of a normal map. Therefore, in the classical surgery approach to our question, one starts with a normal map  (suppose there exists any), and performs surgery on it. This has several advantages:

By Whitehead's theorem, the map  is a homotopy equivalence if and only if the surgery kernel is zero.
Then it can be represented by an embedding (or immersion) whose normal bundle is stably trivial. This observation is important since surgery is only possible on embeddings with a trivial normal bundle. Therefore, surgery on normal maps can always be done below the middle dimension. This is not true for arbitrary maps.

Notice that this new approach makes it necessary to classify the bordism classes of normal maps, which are the normal invariants. Contrarily to cobordism classes of maps, the normal invariants are a cohomology theory. Its coefficients are known in the case of topological manifolds. For the case of smooth manifolds, the coefficients of the theory are much more complicated.

Normal invariants versus structure set
There are two reasons why it is important to study the set . Recall that the main goal of surgery theory is to answer the questions:

1. Given a finite Poincaré complex  is there an -manifold homotopy equivalent to ?

2. Given two homotopy equivalences , where  is there a diffeomorphism  such that ?

Notice that if the answer to these questions should be positive then it is a necessary condition that the answer to the following two questions is positive

1.' Given a finite Poincaré complex  is there a degree one normal map ?
 
2.' Given two homotopy equivalences , where  is there a normal cobordism  such that  and ?

This is of course an almost trivial observation, but it is important because it turns out that there is an effective theory which answers question 1.' and also an effective theory which answers question 1. provided the answer to 1.' is yes. Similarly for questions 2. and 2.' Notice also that we can phrase the questions as follows:

1.' Is ?

2.' Is  in ?

Hence studying  is really a first step in trying to understand the surgery structure set  which is the main goal in surgery theory. The point is that  is much more accessible from the point of view of algebraic topology as is explained below.

Homotopy theory
1.' Let X be a finite n-dimensional Poincaré complex. Recall that a (smooth) manifold has a unique tangent bundle and a unique stable normal bundle. But a finite Poincaré complex does not possess such a unique bundle. Nevertheless, it possesses a substitute - a unique in some sense spherical fibration - the so-called Spivak normal fibration. This has a property that if  is homotopy equivalent to a manifold then the spherical fibration associated to the pullback of the normal bundle of that manifold is isomorphic to the Spivak normal fibration. So it follows that if  then the Spivak normal fibration has a bundle reduction. By the Pontrjagin-Thom construction the converse is also true.

This can be formulated in terms of homotopy theory. Recall  the classifying space for stable spherical fibrations,   the classifying space for stable vector bundles and the map  which is induced by the inclusion  and which corresponds to taking the associated spherical fibration of a vector bundle. In fact we have a fibration sequence . The Spivak normal fibration is classified by a map . It has a vector bundle reduction if and only if  has a lift . This is equivalent to requiring that the composition  is null-homotopic.

There are in fact such finite Poincaré complexes, and the first example was obtained by Gitler and Stasheff, yielding thus an example of a Poincaré complex not homotopy equivalent to a manifold.

2.' Relativizing the above considerations one obtains an (unnatural) bijection

Different categories
The above bijection gives  a structure of an abelian group since the space  is a loop space and in fact an infinite loop space so the normal invariants are a zeroth cohomology group of an extraordinary cohomology theory defined by that infinite loop space. Note that similar ideas apply in the other categories of manifolds and one has bijections

It is well known that the spaces

 ,  and 

are mutually not homotopy equivalent and hence one obtains three different cohomology theories.

He showed that these spaces possess alternative infinite loop space structures which are in fact better from the following point of view: Recall that there is a surgery obstruction map from normal invariants to the L-group. With the above described groups structure on the normal invariants this map is NOT a homomorphism. His theorem also links these new group structures to the well-known cohomology theories: the singular cohomology and real K-theory.

References

Surgery theory